The Ninigo Islands are a group of 31 islands within the Western Islands of the Bismarck Archipelago, Papua New Guinea.

History
The first settlers on the Ninigo Islands were the Melanesians. Other groups later settled in the island group, including the Polynesians and Germans. These islands belong to Micronesian outliers. 

The first sighting by Europeans of Ninigo islands was by the Spanish navigator Iñigo Órtiz de Retes on 27 July 1545 when on board of the carrack San Juan tried to return from Tidore to New Spain. He charted them as La Barbada (the bearded island in Spanish).

References

Bismarck Archipelago
Archipelagoes of Papua New Guinea
Manus Province